Zarek may refer to:

 Tom Zarek, a character from the modern version of Battlestar Galactica
 Zarek, a Marvel Comics character
 Żarek, Warmian-Masurian Voivodeship, a village in Poland
 Zarek Valentin, an American soccer player

See also
 Zarak (disambiguation)